Gashmi (also Romanized as Gashmī) is a village in Surak Rural District, Lirdaf District, Jask County, Hormozgan Province, Iran. At the 2006 census, its population was 122, in 29 families.

References 

Populated places in Jask County